Macropathus is a genus of cave wētā in the family Rhaphidophoridae, endemic to New Zealand.

Distribution and habitat 

Macropathus are only found in New Zealand, and can be found in both the North Island and the South Island. There are yet to be any observations on the offshore islands. They live in caves, and in the open, under rocks.

Threats 
Macropathus face the same threats as most species of wētā, predation by introduced species, and habitat destruction by humans.

Species 
This genus was revised a number of times before Aola Richards examined the type material from the British Museum of Natural History (London) and clarified how if differs from the genus Pachyrhamma. Genetic data suggests that Macropathus filifer is sister to New Zealand and Tasmanian and Falkland Island species.   
 Macropathus filifer Walker, 1869
 Macropathus huttoni Kirby, 1906

References 

Ensifera genera
Cave weta